The Cienega Valley AVA is an American Viticultural Area located in western San Benito County, California, United States. It is part of the larger Central Coast AVA. The valley was once a major source of wine grapes for Almaden Vineyards before it was acquired by Constellation Brands in 1987. Soil on the east side of the fault is predominantly granite and sandstone, whereas soils on the west side of the fault are predominantly granite and limestone. It contains some of the oldest pinot noir grapes in California.

References

American Viticultural Areas
American Viticultural Areas of California
Geography of San Benito County, California
1982 establishments in California